Li Lei (born 9 October 1974) is a retired javelin thrower from PR China. Her personal best throw is 63.69 metres, achieved in June 2000 in Jinzhou.  

She won the gold medals at the 1995 and the 1998 Asian Championships, and finished eighth at the 1996 Olympic Games, sixth at the 1998 IAAF World Cup and eleventh at the 2000 Olympic Games.

She represented her home region of Beijing at the 1997 National Games of China and placed third.

International competitions

1Representing Asia

References

1974 births
Living people
Athletes from Beijing
Chinese female javelin throwers
Olympic athletes of China
Athletes (track and field) at the 1996 Summer Olympics
Athletes (track and field) at the 2000 Summer Olympics
Athletes (track and field) at the 1998 Asian Games
Asian Games competitors for China
20th-century Chinese women
21st-century Chinese women